Moon Design Publications are publishers of tabletop role-playing game books set in Greg Stafford's world of Glorantha. They were founded in 1998 by Rick Meints and Colin Phillips in the UK.

History
In the 1990s, American expatriate Rick Meints was a member of the Reaching Moon Megacorp, the British fan publisher that was the center of Glorantha culture at the time. The Reaching Moon Megacorp published Meints' book on collecting Gloranthan publications, The Meints Index to Glorantha (1996, 1999), but by the time of the book's second edition, the Megacorp was on its way out as a decade of constant publication and convention organizing had burned out its main members. Meints and Colin Phillips thus created Moon Design Publications to reprint long out-of-print RuneQuest supplements.

Over a six-year period, Moon Design published four compilations of old RuneQuest material under the title "Gloranthan Classics"; the first was Pavis & Big Rubble (1999) while the last was Borderlands & Beyond (2005). By the time of Borderlands' publication, Greg Stafford had returned from a one-year stay in Mexico and was looking for a new company to carry on the publications of Issaries, and chose Moon Design, by now done with the major Gloranthan books published by Chaosium.

Though it got out its first book, Imperial Lunar Handbook Volume 2 (2006), fairly quickly, only two more HeroQuest books would come out by 2008 – plus a few of Greg Stafford's "unfinished works", which Moon Design rebranded as the Stafford Library.

In 2008 Jeff Richard came on board as both co-owner and principal Gloranthan author. Soon afterward the company published the second edition of HeroQuest (2009), revised by author Robin Laws. That same year also saw the publication of Sartar: Kingdom of Heroes (2009), a massive book that expanded on the Sartarite background of Hero Wars to create a comprehensive setting for the game, further expanded by Stafford's Book of Heortling Mythology (2009) and the Sartar Companion (2010).

Publications

Glorantha Classics

References

Role-playing game publishing companies